The Crazy Mountains, often called the Crazies, is a mountain range in the Central Montana Alkalic Province in the U.S. state of Montana. They are a part of the northern Rocky Mountains.

Geography
Spanning a distance of 40 miles (64 km), the Crazy Mountains are located between the Musselshell and Yellowstone rivers.

The Crazy Mountains form an isolated island range east of the Continental Divide. Other isolated ranges in Montana include the Castle Mountains, Little Belt Mountains, Big Snowy Mountains, Little Snowy Mountains, Bears Paw Mountains, Judith Mountains, North and South Moccasin Mountains, Highwood Mountains, Little Rocky Mountains, Sweet Grass Hills, Bull Mountains and, in the southeastern corner of the state near Ekalaka, the Long Pines.

Geology
The Big Timber Stock, a large igneous intrusion, forms the bedrock in the Crazy Mountains.  The stock is of Tertiary age, and consists of diorite and gabbro with zones of Quartz Monzodiorite, and which has been intruded by many dikes and sills.

Geological features of the Crazy Mountains include:
 Shields River
 South Fork Musselshell River
 Sweet Grass Creek
 Crazy Peak

Adjacent Counties
 Meagher County, Montana - north
 Sweet Grass County, Montana - east
 Park County, Montana - west, south

Wildlife

Due to the eastern location, these mountains are drier and less densely forested than other mountain ranges in Montana. There are at least 40 alpine lakes in the range, 15 of which are named. The Crazy Mountains sit in both Gallatin National Forest and Lewis and Clark National Forest.  The Crazies support a healthy herd of mountain goats and the occasional elusive wolverine.

History
In 1916, the Crazy Mountains were proposed as a location for a national park, but Congress failed to pass the legislation. National Park Service officials considered the area again in 1935, but reported that a national park would not be feasible because "half of the land, every alternate section, is owned by the Northern Pacific Railroad or is in private hands."

Access
The Crazies are almost completely surrounded by private lands making access into the mountains somewhat difficult, especially in the southern section where the highest peaks are located.

Name origin
The name Crazy Mountains is said to be a shortened form of the name "Crazy Woman Mountains" given them, in complement to their original Crow name, after a woman who went insane and lived in them after her family was killed in the westward settlement movement.

The Crow people called the mountains Awaxaawapìa Pìa, roughly translated as "Ominous Mountains", or even more roughly, "Crazy Mountains". They were famous to the Crow people for having metaphysical powers and being unpredictable—a place used for vision quests.

See also
 List of mountain ranges in Montana

Notes

External links

 Crazy Mountains: Backdrop to Big Timber SweetgrassCounty.Com
 Fishing, Hiking and Camping in the Crazy Mountains BigSkyFishing.Com
 

Mountain ranges of Montana
Ranges of the Rocky Mountains
Landforms of Sweet Grass County, Montana
Landforms of Park County, Montana
Gallatin National Forest
Lewis and Clark National Forest